The 2009 MSA British Rally Championship season was the 51st season of the British Rally Championship. The season consisted of six rounds and began on 28 March with International Rally North Wales. The season ended on 26 September, at the International Rally Yorkshire. Irishman Keith Cronin won the title at his first attempt after a season-long battle with Mark Higgins.

Calendar
The calendar still has six rounds in 2009. Last years season climax, Wales Rally GB is no longer a round of the BRC and is replaced with a new season opener, the Bulldog International Rally North Wales.

Major Entries

R4 Class

Results

Drivers' Championship standings
These results are based on overall positions in the rally, in which there may be entries which are not eligible for BRC points. Only the five best results from the six rallies count towards a driver's final score. (*) denotes the dropped score.

References

External links
Official Website

British Rally Championship seasons
Rally Championship
British Rally Championship